Postal interception is the act of retrieving another person's mail for the purpose of either ensuring that the mail is not delivered to the recipient, or to spy on them.

For instance, the American Central Intelligence Agency (CIA) and Federal Bureau of Investigation (FBI) were involved in numerous large-scale operations targeting US activist groups, whose mail was opened and photographed. In one such programme, over 215,000 letters were opened. In the United Kingdom, the Special Investigations Unit of the General Post Office was responsible for postal interception.

Since 2002, the United States Postal Service photographs the outside of all mail, retains those images for weeks or months, and provides them to police or other investigators upon a simple request.

See also
 COINTELPRO
 Surveillance
 Church committee
 Black room
 Postal censorship
Secrecy of correspondence
 Mail cover
 Mail Isolation Control and Tracking

References

Surveillance
Espionage techniques
Postal systems